Goleta station is a passenger rail station in the city of Goleta, California. It is served by five daily round trips of the Amtrak Pacific Surfliner; it is the northern terminal for three of those round trips.

History
The original depot, built in 1901, was moved to Lake Los Carneros County Park, half a mile northwest of the current location, in 1981 and currently serves as the home of the South Coast Railroad Museum.

Opened with a concrete platform and open-air shelter in 1998, the station gained a restroom facility in 2008 that was installed through the joint effort of the city, California Department of Transportation (Caltrans), Amtrak and the Santa Barbara Council of Governments. The station also received bike racks and a new bus turning circle.

In 2018, the station was awarded a $13 million TIRCP grant to upgrade the station.

References

External links

Amtrak stations in Santa Barbara County, California
Goleta, California
Railway stations in the United States opened in 1998